Wattleup is a southern suburb of Perth, Western Australia, located within the City of Cockburn. In the mid 1990's to the early 2000's, planning was undertaken to redevelop the suburb as part of the Hope Valley-Wattleup Redevelopment Project, also known as "Latitude 32". This was to involve the acquisition and demolition of the townsite, and its rezoning and redevelopment for industrial use. The townsite of Wattleup was located at the western end of the suburb, at the intersection of Wattleup Road and Rockingham Road. Wattleup had many market gardens in the past. They provided agricultural produce for the town of Fremantle.

The suburb's name originates from Wattleup Road which dates back to 1931. The name of Wattleup was approved for the suburb in May 1962.

References

External links

Suburbs of Perth, Western Australia
Suburbs in the City of Cockburn